Kristin Elaine Hunter (September 12, 1931 – November 14, 2008) was an African-American writer from Pennsylvania. She sometimes wrote under the name Kristin Hunter Lattany. She is best known for her first novel, God Bless the Child, published in 1964.

Biography
Hunter was born Kristin Elaine Eggleston in Philadelphia, to George L. Eggleston and the former Mabel Manigault, and attended Haddon Heights High School until 1947. When she was aged 14, she began writing a column about young people for the Pittsburgh Courier, continuing to do so until 1952, the year after she graduated from the University of Pennsylvania, where she received her bachelor's degree in Education (1951).

In 1955 she won a national television competition for her script Minority of One. Her first and most acclaimed novel, God Bless the Child, was published in 1964, and won the Philadelphia Athenaeum Literary Award. Like most of her work, it confronts complex issues of race and gender. Her 1966 novel The Landlord was made into a movie by Hal Ashby (United Artists, 1970). Her 1973 collection of short stories, Guests in the Promised Land, was nominated for the National Book Award.

In 1972, she began teaching in the English department at the University of Pennsylvania, eventually retiring from the university in 1995.  She was also a visiting professor at Emory University. She received the Moonstone Black Writing Celebration Lifetime Achievement Award in 1996.

Commenting on her own work, she said: "The bulk of my work has dealt—imaginatively, I hope—with relations between the white and black races in America. My early work was 'objective,' that is, sympathetic to both whites and blacks, and seeing members of both groups from a perspective of irony and humor against the wider backdrop of human experience as a whole. Since about 1968 my subjective anger has been emerging, along with my grasp of the real situation in this society, though my sense of humor and my basic optimism keep cropping up like uncontrollable weeds."

Personal life
She married writer Joseph Hunter in 1952. They divorced in 1962, and she married John Lattany in 1968.

She died in 2008, aged 77, of a heart attack after collapsing in her home in Magnolia, New Jersey.

Books
God Bless the Child, 1964.
The Landlord, 1966. 
The Soul Brothers and Sister Lou (National Council on Interracial Books for the Children Award), 1968.
Boss Cat, 1971.
Guests in the Promised Land (stories; nominated for the National Book Award), 1973.
The Survivors, 1975.
The Lakestown Rebellion, 1978.
Lou in the Limelight, 1981.
Kinfolks, 1996.
The Scribe, 1998.
Do Unto Others, 2000.
Breaking Away, 2003.
Mom Luby and the Social Worker ,

References

External links

 Kristin Hunter, "A short story" ("Debut"), Negro Digest, June 1968, pp. 62–69.
 Kristin Hunter Lattany writings from Free Library of Philadelphia. Children's Literature Research Collection

1931 births
2008 deaths
Haddon Heights Junior/Senior High School alumni
University of Pennsylvania alumni
American women novelists
20th-century American novelists
20th-century American women writers
American Book Award winners
African-American novelists
20th-century African-American women writers
20th-century African-American writers
21st-century African-American people
21st-century African-American women